This is a list of the number of languages by country and dependency according to the 22nd edition of Ethnologue (2019).

Papua New Guinea has the largest number of languages in the world.

List

See also
List of languages by number of native speakers
List of languages by total number of speakers
List of languages by the number of countries in which they are recognized as an official language
List of official languages by country and territory
Linguistic diversity index

Notes

References

Lists of languages by country